Cornelis Kaimu is an Indonesian professional footballer who currently plays as a forward for Persijap Jepara in the Indonesia Super League.

Career

Persijap Jepara
He scored his first goal for Persijap in a 1–0 win against Persik Kediri.

References

External links
 
 Player profil at goal.com

1985 births
Living people
Indonesian footballers
Liga 1 (Indonesia) players
Indonesian Premier Division players
Persijap Jepara players
Persiba Bantul players
Perseman Manokwari players
Association football forwards